Maximus II (? – December 1216) was Patriarch of Constantinople from June to December 1216. He had been abbot of the monastery of the Akoimetoi and was the confessor of the Nicaean emperor Theodore I Laskaris before he became patriarch. George Akropolites and Xanthopoulos are highly critical of Maximos, suggesting that he was "uneducated" and that the only reason he was made patriarch was his intrigue into the palace's women's quarters. Akropolites writes that he "paid court to the women's quarters and was in turn courted by it; for it was nothing else which raised him to such eminence." Maximus was Patriarch-in-exile as at the time his titular seat was occupied by the Latin Patriarch of Constantinople, and he lived in Nicaea. He died in office after only six months on the patriarchal throne.

References

1216 deaths
13th-century patriarchs of Constantinople
People of the Empire of Nicaea
Year of birth unknown